Sir John Walter, 3rd Baronet  (c. 1674–1722) of Sarsden House, Oxfordshire was a British politician who sat in the English House of Commons between 1694 and 1717 and in the  British House of Commons from 1708 to 1722.

Biography
Walter was the eldest surviving son of Sir William Walter, 2nd Baronet and his first wife Mary Tufton, daughter of John Tufton, 2nd Earl of Thanet. He matriculated at Queen's College, Oxford, on 21 August 1691.  On  5 March 1694 he succeeded his father to the estates and the baronetcy. He married. Elizabeth Vernon, daughter of  Sir Thomas Vernon  merchant and MP of London in about 1700.

Walter was returned as Member of Parliament for Appleby at a by-election on 13 December 1694 on the interest of his uncle Thomas Tufton, 6th Earl of Thanet. He did not stand at the 1695 English general election  but was returned again for Appleby at a by-election on 23 December 1697 and then at the 1698 English general election.  He was defeated at Appleby at the first general election of 1701 and did not stand there again. He stood unsuccessfully at Woodstock at the 1705 English general election and was elected MP for Oxford at a by-election on 11 December 1706. He was returned unopposed there at the  1708 British general election. He was one of a  group of wine-bibbing Tories who came together under the Duke of Beaufort's lead in July 1709 to establish the ‘Board of Brothers’. He was a High Church supporter of Dr Sacheverell, and voted against his impeachment early in 1710. At the  1710 British general election he was returned again for Oxford, and was listed as a ‘worthy patriot’ who assisted in exposing the mismanagements of the previous Whig administration, and in 1711 as a ‘Tory patriot’ opposed to the continuance of war.  In 1711 he was appointed  Clerk of the Green Cloth and held the post until 1714. He was returned unopposed for Oxford  again at the 1713 British general election. He was returned unopposed as a Tory for Oxford in 1715 and  1722. He voted against the Administration in every recorded division

Private life
Walter was a bon viveur who enjoyed drinking (particularly fine French wines), smart fashion,  gambling and horse racing and was a popular socialite. His friend Jonathan Swift described him as ”an honest drunken fellow”.  However his extravagance forced him to sell off property to pay his debts. He sold Godstow to the Earl of Abingdon in 1702, most of Cutteslowe to William Breach in 1703, and the remainder of Cutteslowe and Wolvercote to the Duke of Marlborough in 1710.

Walter died on 11 June 1722 and was buried at Sarsden. His  marriage had been childless and he was succeeded in the baronetcy by his half-brother Robert.  He left the Sarsden estate to his wife with reversion to Robert upon her death. He also left £1,000 to his friend  Lord Harcourt who in 1724 married Walter's widow. The baronetcy became extinct in 1731 when Sir Robert  died childless, and the estate then became caught up in a protracted Chancery suit.

References

1670s births
1722 deaths
Alumni of The Queen's College, Oxford
British MPs 1708–1710
British MPs 1710–1713
British MPs 1713–1715
British MPs 1715–1722
British MPs 1722–1727
Members of the Parliament of Great Britain for English constituencies
Baronets in the Baronetage of England